Big Brother 2001, also known as Big Brother 2, was the second series of the British reality television series Big Brother. The show followed eleven contestants, known as housemates, who were isolated from the outside world for an extended period of time in a custom built House. Each week, one or more of the housemates were evicted by a public vote. The last remaining housemate, Brian Dowling, was declared the winner, winning a cash prize of £70,000.

As with the previous series, Big Brother 2 lasted 64 days. It launched on Channel 4 on 25 May 2001 and ended on 27 July 2001. Davina McCall returned as presenter for her second consecutive year. Ten housemates entered on launch night, with one additional housemate being introduced in the third week. The series was watched by an average of 4.5 million viewers, matching the average viewership of the first series. The Final however attracted Big Brother's most watched rating ever, Which attracted 13.7 million viewers - making it Channel 4's second most watched broadcast. It also spawned Big Brothers first ancillary show entitled Big Brother's Little Brother, presented by Dermot O'Leary.

In 2010, Dowling was voted by the public as Big Brother's "Ultimate Housemate", after winning Ultimate Big Brother, the final series of the show to air on Channel 4. When Big Brother moved to Channel 5 in 2011, he replaced McCall as presenter, and remained in the role until 2013.

Development

Big Brother first began airing in the Netherlands, while editions in countries such as Germany proving to be hits with the public. Following the success of the show, it was confirmed that editions for the United States and the United Kingdom were in the works. Big Brother 1 (2000) proved to be a ratings success for Channel 4, leading to the announcement of a second series. Prior to Big Brother 2, a celebrity edition of the show aired on Channel 4. Rumors of a second series began in September 2000, when it was confirmed that Channel 5 and ITV were both interested in acquiring the series. Casting for Big Brother 2 began in late 2000. Candidates for the new series were able to apply by sending in a video audition. In December 2000, it was reported that more than 250,000 applications had been sent in; the first season received an estimated 40,000 applications. The live feed returned for this series, with a total of four feeds available on the Channel 4 site. The feed was cut for an estimated two hours nightly, and featured a delay for privacy reasons.

Davina McCall returned to present the series after presenting the prior series. The original ten housemates entered the house on 25 May 2001. Amongst the cast this series was Amma Antwi-Agyei, a stripper who wanted to "show Britain that not all strippers are the Jerry Springer stereotype." Housemate Elizabeth Woodcock was dating an older man prior to appearing on the series, while Dean O'Laughlin had been in a band that toured across the United States before being dropped by their record label. Brian Dowling was the first openly gay male to appear on the series, with Josh Rafter also being gay. This season featured a total of five women and six men.

The series launched on 25 May 2001 on Channel 4. There were a total of four highlight shows airing Monday through Thursday, with Friday being a live eviction episode presented by Davina McCall. Two episodes of the series aired on Friday. During the first episode, viewers were shown the highlights from the previous day and McCall revealed the housemate who had been evicted from the House. Two hours following this, the second episode of the night aired which saw the evicted housemate exit the House and participate in an interview with McCall. One of the highlight episodes per week featured a team of psychologists discussing the events of the previous week from their viewpoint. The series lasted for 64 days, concluding on 27 July 2001. There were a total of 55 episodes this series. This was the first season to feature the spin-off series Big Brother's Little Brother (2001–10), presented by Dermot O'Leary; Natalie Casey co-presented the series with O'Leary during the first week. Big Brother Reveals More (2001) aired solely during this series, and saw the major plot points of the past week being recapped.

The series was the first to be sponsored by BT Cellnet (who have, since 2002, been called O2) they remained sponsors until the fourth series in 2003.

House
For the first two series, the house was located in Bow, London near to the 3 Mills Studios. The second series had a bigger budget, and the house used was renovated for a new look. Despite a similar layout to the original house, the decorations and furniture were completely different. The new House had a "Cabin fever" theme, as the format of the show was similar to the feeling of having cabin fever. With this theme, there were wooden walls throughout the majority of the house. There was a living room, where important news such as nominations were revealed to the housemates. The kitchen remained simple, with only necessities such as an oven, fridge, and sink. In the "Diary Room", in which housemates may speak privately and reveal their true feelings to the public, there is a more interesting look to it. The background of the room has the appearance of a garage door, with the Big Brother eye logo imprinted on it. Like the previous season, there is a men's and women's bedroom, each with five beds in them. One of the five in each room is larger than all of the others. Unlike the previous season, however, the men and women were allowed to choose which bedroom belonged to which gender. The outside of the house features a chicken coop, with seven hens and one rooster. The housemates must care for the chickens during their stay in the house, and must also use the eggs from the chickens to eat, otherwise they must use some of their budget to buy eggs. The house also features a garden, which the housemates use to grow plants and vegetables to eat. The Housemates were later given a hot tub to use in the backyard, placed close to the garden. A new feature this year was the addition of the den outside, a small area in the backyard in which housemates could enter to lounge and speak to one another. There were no couches or seats, but there were various pillows scattered around.

Format

Big Brother was a game show in which a group of contestants, referred to as housemates, lived in isolation from the outside world in a custom built "house", constantly under video surveillance. During their time in the House, the housemates were required to nominate two of their fellow contestants for potential eviction, and the two or more with the most votes would be nominated. This process was mandatory for all housemates, and failure to comply could result in ejection from the house. Despite this, should a housemate enter the House following the launch, they are immune from the first round of nominations they are present for. The public, through a vote conducted by phone, would vote to evict one of the nominated housemates from the House, and the housemate with the most votes from the viewers would be evicted from the House. When only four housemates remained, the public would vote for which of them should win the series, and the housemates with the most votes would become the winner. The housemates were competing for a £70,000 cash prize.
Books, allowed in Series 1, were banned in Series 2.
During their time in the House, housemates were given weekly tasks to perform. The housemates would wager a portion of their weekly shopping budget on the task, and would either win double their wagered fund or lose the wagered fund depending on their performance in the task. The housemates were required to work as a group to complete the task, with the format of the tasks varying based on the number of remaining housemates. Should the housemates run out of the food provided for them, an emergency ration was available to them. The housemates were forbidden from discussing nominations, and doing so could result in punishment. The format of the series was mainly seen as a social experiment, and required housemates to interact with others who may have differing ideals, beliefs, and prejudices. Housemates were also required to make visits to the Diary Room during their stay in the House, where they were able to share their thoughts and feelings on their fellow housemates and the game. While in the House, the housemates are free to leave at any time, however, will not be allowed to return to the House. Similarly, a housemate can be removed from the House by production should they repeatedly break the rules set for the housemates. Should a housemate choose to leave the House or be ejected, a replacement housemate will enter the House sometime after their departure. Upon entering the House, new housemates are exempt from the first round of nominations they are present for.

Housemates

Weekly summary

Nominations table
{| class="wikitable" style="text-align:center; width:100%; font-size:9pt; line-height:15px;"
|-
! style="width:9%"|
! style="width:9%"|Week 2[1]
! style="width:9%"|Week 3
! style="width:9%"|Week 4
! style="width:9%"|Week 5
! style="width:9%"|Week 6
! style="width:9%"|Week 7
! style="width:9%"|Week 8
! style="width:9%" colspan="2"|Week 9Final[3]
! style="width:1%"|Nominationsreceived
|-
! style="background:#000" colspan="11"|
|-
! Brian
| Helen,Elizabeth || Stuart,Helen || Paul,Amma || Paul,Amma || Paul,Amma || Paul,Josh || Paul,Helen || colspan="2" style="background:#73FB76"|Winner(Day 64) || style="background:#73FB76"|8
|-
! Helen
| Bubble,Narinder || Narinder,Bubble || Brian,Narinder || Bubble,Brian || Josh,Dean || Dean,Josh || Dean,Elizabeth || colspan="2" style="background:#D1E8EF"|Runner-up(Day 64) || style="background:#D1E8EF"|16
|-
! Dean
| Narinder,Penny || Narinder,Paul || Paul,Narinder || Paul,Helen || Paul,Amma || Helen,Josh || Paul,Helen || colspan="2" style="background:#ffffdd"|Third Place(Day 64) || style="background:#ffffdd" |4
|-
! Elizabeth
| Penny,Helen || Paul,Stuart || Narinder,Paul || Paul,Brian || Paul,Helen || Paul,Helen || Paul,Helen || colspan="2" style="background:#ffffdd"|Fourth Place(Day 63) || style="background:#ffffdd"|4
|-
! Paul
| Amma,Helen || Amma,Bubble || Brian,Bubble || Amma,Bubble || Amma,Elizabeth || Brian,Josh || Brian,Elizabeth || style="background:#FA8072" colspan="2"|Evicted(Day 57) || style="background:#FA8072"|25
|-
! Josh
| style="background:#fff" colspan="1"|Not inHouse || style="background:#FBF373"|Exempt[2] || Narinder,Bubble || Paul,Bubble || Amma,Brian || Brian,Helen || style="background:#fa8072" colspan="3"|Evicted(Day 50) || style="background:#FA8072"|8
|-
! Amma
| Paul,Penny || Paul,Stuart || Narinder,Paul || Paul,Dean || Paul,Josh || style="background:#FA8072" colspan="4"|Evicted(Day 43) || style="background:#FA8072"|12
|-
! Bubble
| Paul,Penny || Paul,Helen || Narinder,Josh || Paul,Josh || style="background:#FA8072" colspan="5"|Evicted(Day 36) || style="background:#FA8072"|10
|-
! Narinder
| Helen,Bubble || Stuart,Helen || Amma,Bubble || style="background:#FA8072" colspan="6"|Evicted(Day 29) || style="background:#FA8072"|12
|-
! Stuart
| Penny,Narinder || Amma,Narinder || style="background:#FA8072" colspan="7"|Evicted(Day 22) || style="background:#FA8072"|4
|-
! Penny
| Helen,Amma || style="background:#FA8072" colspan="8"|Evicted''(Day 15) || style="background:#FA8072"|5
|-
! style="background:#000" colspan="11"|
|-
! Againstpublic vote
| Helen,Penny || Paul,Stuart || Narinder,Paul || Bubble,Paul || Amma,Paul || Helen,Josh || Helen,Paul || colspan="2"|Brian,Dean,Elizabeth,Helen || style="background:#ccc" rowspan="5"|
|-
! rowspan="2"|Evicted
| style="background:#FA8072" rowspan="2"|Penny58%to evict
| style="background:#FA8072" rowspan="2"|Stuart86%to evict
| style="background:#FA8072" rowspan="2"|Narinder62%to evict
| style="background:#FA8072" rowspan="2"|Bubble53%to evict
| style="background:#FA8072" rowspan="2"|Amma64%to evict
| style="background:#FA8072" rowspan="2"|Josh84%to evict
| style="background:#FA8072" rowspan="2"|Paul84%to evict
| nowrap style="background:#ffffdd"|Elizabeth2%(out of 4)
| nowrap style="background:#ffffdd"|Dean5%(out of 3)
|-
| style="background:#D1E8EF"|Helen39%(out of 2)
| style="background:#73FB76"|Brian61%to win
|}

Notes

 : On Day 8, housemates were required to make their nominations during a live broadcast.
 :  As a new housemate, Josh could not nominate and could not be nominated by his fellow housemates.
 : There were no nominations in the final week as the public were voting for who they wanted to win rather than to evict. On Day 63, the voting lines were frozen, and a vote count was made. The housemate with the fewest votes to win, Elizabeth, was evicted. The voting lines for the remaining three housemates then re-opened, and were closed for good during the final on Day 64.

Ratings
Weekly ratings for each show on Channel 4. All numbers are in millions and provided by BARB.

Controversy & criticism
In the fifth week, when Bubble was nominated against Paul for eviction, Bubble was evicted from the house. His eviction was seen as controversial, when it was uncovered that a phone number posted on the internet advertising news for rival football clubs had actually been falsely set-up, and would register voters to evict Bubble from the House. The vote to evict Bubble was only 53%, thus excluding the votes that were falsely cast, Bubble could have stayed in the game over Paul, who went on to receive fifth place in the series. In total, Bubble received 534,574 votes, while Paul received 470,059. This marked the second time in the series that the voting process had been tampered with, when last series a mass email was sent out that featured a link to evict Housemate Melanie, though it appeared to be a link to claim a free vacation. Much like the previous series as well, this season had controversial moments due to outside interference. A few days before the first round of nominations, two fireworks were let off near the house, and the housemates were immediately sent inside for fear that it could be a secret message for a Housemate. In the fifth week of the game, two intruders broke into the house, and got into the hot tub. The remaining Housemates were put on lockdown, and security removed the intruders from the house immediately. The intrusion led to more security being put on the house. Some controversy also affected the Housemates personal lives. Penny, who was a teacher before entering the house, reportedly upset her boss, who felt her showering nude in the house "set a bad example for her pupils."

References

External links
Big Brother - Series 2 at Channel4.com

2001 British television seasons
 2